Genoplesium woollsii, commonly known as the dark midge-orchid, is a species of orchid endemic to New South Wales. It has a single thin, wiry leaf and in autumn has up to thirty five drooping, dark purple flowers on a flowering stem which is fused to the lower part of the leaf.

Description 
Genoplesium woollsii is a terrestrial, perennial, deciduous, sympodial herb with a single cylindrical, glabrous leaf fused to the flowering stem. As with others in the genus the flowers are inverted so that the labellum is above the column rather than below it. There is a callus in the centre of the labellum and along about three-quarters of its length. Flowering usually occurs between February and April.

Taxonomy and naming 
The dark midge orchid was first formally described in 1865 by Ferdinand von Mueller who gave it the name Prasophyllum woollsii and published the description in Fragmenta phytographiae Australiae''''. In 1989, David Jones and Mark Clements changed the name to Genoplesium woollsii''.

Distribution and habitat 
The dark midge-orchid grows in heath, forest and moss gardens mainly between the Blue Mountains and Batemans Bay.

References

External links 
 

woollsii
Orchids of New South Wales
Endemic orchids of Australia
Plants described in 1865